Michael Johnston may refer to:

 Michael Johnston (actor) (born 1996), American actor
 Michael Johnston (Australian footballer) (born 1971), former Hawthorn AFL footballer
 Mike Johnston (Colorado politician) (born 1974), Colorado state senator
 Michael Johnston (Welsh footballer) (born 1987), Brickfield Rangers player
 Mike Johnston (baseball) (born 1979), American baseball player
 Mike Johnston (drummer) (born 1976), American drummer
 Mike Johnston (ice hockey) (born 1957), NHL coach
 Mikey Johnston (born 1999), Irish footballer
 Mike Johnston (Kansas politician) (born 1945), Kansas state senator and cabinet secretary

See also
 Michael Johnson (disambiguation)